Wukuaicuo is a station on the Orange line of Kaohsiung MRT in Lingya District, Kaohsiung, Taiwan.

Station overview

The station is a two-level underground station with an island platform and six exits. It is 206 metres long and is located at the intersection of Jhongjheng 1st Rd and Fude Rd.

Station layout

Exits
Exit 1: Jhongjheng 1st Rd. (north)
Exit 2: Fude 2nd Rd. (west), Wumiao Rd.
Exit 3: Jhongjheng 1st Rd. (south), Fude 3rd Rd.
Exit 4: Chen Jhonghe Mausoleum, Fude 3rd Rd.
Exit 5:Fude 2nd Rd. (east), Wumiao Rd.
Exit 6: Jhengyan Rd. (north), Jianmin Rd.

Around the station
 Tomb of Chen Jhong-he
 Kaohsiung Guandi Temple
 National Science and Technology Museum

References

2008 establishments in Taiwan
Kaohsiung Metro Orange line stations
Lingya District
Railway stations opened in 2008